Dictator is the first EP by Japanese visual kei band Diaura, released on 10 August 2011 by Galaxy. It reached 195th place on the Oricon weekly chart, all of the 1,000 copies of the first press were sold out. It was re-released by Ains on 19 December 2012, with one extra song included.

Track listing

References

2011 EPs
Diaura albums